Philippe Aractingi (born 1964, Beirut, Lebanon) is a film director and producer. He was born in Beirut, Aractingi is Franco-Lebanese.

Early life
At the age of 8, his father gave him his first camera. He lived on the demarcation line, at the heart of the action, so he put his photography skills to the test and started capturing scenes through his lens that went on to be published in various international news publications.

Around that time, film was not yet a discipline taught in schools. However, Aractingi was not discouraged by this and decided to teach himself. At the age of 20, he filmed his first war documentary, in his hometown, Beirut.

Recognizing his interest in the audiovisual world, he moved to Paris in 1989, where he continued writing, directing and occasionally producing over 40 documentaries and short films in the following years. He shot most of his works in various countries such as Egypt, France, Mongolia, Morocco, South Africa, Sri Lanka, and Tunisia, among other locations.

Achievements
In the early 1980s and with no available audio-visual programs in a war-ridden country, Aractingi taught himself the art of filmmaking.

Two of his films “Bosta” and “Under the Bombs” were the only Lebanese entries in the 2006 and 2008 Oscar ceremonies, respectively.

His other releases have been praised and awarded over 40 times at various international festivals, in Venice, Dubai, Thessaloniki, Rotterdam, and at the Sundance Film Festival, among other events in the film industry.

With his passion for the arts and dedication to defending the Lebanese Film Industry, Aractingi is also the co-founder of the Lebanese Cinema Foundation (FLC) and the vice-chairman of the Beirut Screen Institute committee.

In 2018, Aractingi was appointed Chevalier de l’Ordre des Arts et des Lettres by the French Ministry of Culture.

Documentaries(1984–2005)
At the age of 25, Aractingi left for Paris, France. He dedicated the following 12 years of his career to directing, producing and co-producing over 40 short-films and documentaries, including “Vol Libre au Liban” in 1991 that won the Best Short Film Award at the Saint-Hilary Film Festival; “Par le Regard des Meres” in 1992 that competed in the “Vision du reel”, Nyons Film Festival and “Beyrouth de Pierre et de Mémoires in 1992 that won the gold medal of the games of La Francophonie. In 1995, he also released “Le Rêve de l’Enfant Acrobat” and it won the Grand Jury Prize at the Beirut Film Festival.

Feature films (2005–present)

In 2005, Philippe Aractingi released his first feature film “Bosta”. The film was critically acclaimed and broke audience records in Lebanon with more than 140,000 box office admissions. 100% Produced and financed by Lebanese contributors, this playful and realistic musical breaks the traditional depiction of war in films.

“Bosta” also went on to reconcile the Lebanese public with the cinema and opened the door to a new generation of Lebanese films. The film received eight awards including Best Screenplay at the Carthage Film Festival (JCC), the Golden Murex in Beirut in 2006, and the Best First Work Award at the Arab Film Festival in Rotterdam.

In 2006, when another war broke out in Lebanon, Philippe Aractingi was driven to relate the story through the eyes of two fictional characters, filmed at the very heart of the drama. That’s when he filmed “Under the Bombs”, which was later released in 2008. The story accompanies two professional actors throughout the turmoil and they later come face to face with real players who partook in the 2006 Lebanese-Israeli war.

“Under The Bombs” was distributed in 30 countries and was nominated at the Venice, BAFTA, Dubai and at the Sundance Film Festival. It also won 23 awards, including the Best Actress Award and the Golden Muhr at the International Film Festival. The Audience Award at the Dubai Film Festival (DIFF); the Best Music and the Jury's Choice at the Luchon Festival in 2008, the Netpac and Critic's Awards in Antalya in 2007 and the Fipresci Prize at the Bratislava International Film Festival.

Under the Bombs and Bosta were selected to represent Lebanon at the Oscars in 2006 and 2009.

In 2014, Philippe Aractingi went on a limb and decided to write and produce an autobiography, “Heritages”. This autobiography was a revamped documentary with a hint of fiction that helped Aractingi tell his story. It recounted the various exiles that he and his family had to go through over the past 4 generations, summing up to 100 years of history. The film was nominated at the Dubai International Film Festival (DIFF), the Thessaloniki International Film Festival, and the FIPA, International Festival of Audio Visual Programs, the film is currently a subject of study in more than 30 schools and universities around the world including Boston University.

In 2017, Aractingi released “Listen”. The film was about a modern-day love story that defied the well-defined social norms. “Listen” is a story of a sound engineer meets and falls in love with a strong and free-spirited girl who suddenly slips away in a coma. It is a story that deals with the emancipation of women in the Middle East nowadays. It is a journey through sound and the importance of hearing.

When it aired for the first time at the Dubai International Film Festival (DIFF), "Listen" moved and shocked audiences. PG 18 in Lebanon, the authorities prohibited its distribution in the rest of the Arab world but the film still went on to win the Best Sound, Best Picture and Best Director awards at the Lebanese Movie Awards (LMA) and represented Lebanon at the Golden Globes in 2017.

Production house
In 1989, Aractingi founded his own production company, Fantascope, which allowed him to direct his feature films in a country where cinema was virtually non-existent.

Fantascope Production has produced to date more than a hundred films broadcast on international TV channels such as the Discovery Channel, France 2, France 3, or Arte. Aractingi also produces many films on commission. Among them are films for the Museum of the American University of Beirut's 150th Anniversary, the Museum of the Central Bank of Lebanon and the in-flight safety regulations instructions for Lebanon’s Middle East Airlines (MEA) The Museum of Ksara wine in the Bekaa valley.

In 2019, he also directed "Sur les pas du Christ" (“On The Footsteps of Christ”), a film coproduced with the Maronite Foundation. The film retraces the journey of Jesus Christ in southern Lebanon.
In 2022, he releases "Thawra Soul", a short movie documenting the lebanese revolution, "Thawra", which first began in October 2019.

Photography and videography
From the age of 8, Philippe Aractingi gets behind the camera. When the war broke out, he went out on the streets to capture the scenes. Horrified by what he saw, Aractingi decided to stop taking pictures for quite some time. In 2010, he finally decided to get back behind the camera and develops a series for an exhibit in Paris. The exhibit “Nuit sur Beyrouth” displayed a wide array of shots of Beirut by night. Some of the shots also showed a patchwork of color where the city could be seen, fully lit up on one side but on the other side, it was overcome by darkness due to its infamously frequent power cuts.

His second exhibit “Obsession” took place in Beirut in 2018 and depicted the city’s evolution over time. On one hand, you can clearly see the peaceful care-free days before the war but on the other hand, you can also see how the city was ravaged and disfigured by the war and how today, it’s almost unrecognizable and lies bare for all to see. The exhibition was accompanied by an installation called “Beirut Through Time”. The installation was a setup of three screens showing the city of Beirut from three different perspectives each showing a picture of the same place in different times and stages; life, death and afterlife.

Filmography

Writing
 Métier de femme, métier de mère: Book co-written with Lela Chikhani-Nacouz, an essay that tells the strength and suffering of Lebanese mothers put in pictures in 1992 Through Mother’s Eyes
 Nabil le petit étranger (Script)
 Price Maroun Baghdadi of the Best Script at the International Beirut Festival, 1998
 Lauréat de la Bourse Beaumarchais, 1995
 Scriptwriting contribution by "la commission de l’avance sur recette du CNC", 1996
 Forgiveness (movie scenario, in preparation)
 London Halal (movie scenario, in preparation)

Awards and recognition
Par le Regard des Mères, 1992 (Documentary 52’)

 Official selection at the Festival du Film de Nyons

Beyrouth the Pierre et de Mémoire, 1992 (Essay- 18’)

 Gold medal at the "jeux de la Francophonie" – Paris, 1994
 Jury recognition at "Journées du Cinéma Africain et Créole" – Montreal, 1995

Vol Libre au Liban, 1993 (Short film 18’)

 Jury price at the “festival international de Saint-Hilaire”, 1991
 Lauréat de l’Académie Carat, 1992

Le Rêve de l’Enfant Acrobate, 1995 (Maroc, Documentary 52’)

 Grand Jury price at the Beirut Film Festival, 1997

Listen (2017)

Nominations:

 DIFF – Dubai International Film Festival
 LFF – Lebanese Film Festival Australia
 AFF – Arab film festival in Minnesota
 AFF – Arab film festival in GERMANY (Tubingen)

Awards:

 LEBANESE MOVIE AWARDS (LMA) – best sound, best cinematography, best director
 ALEXANDRIA OFFICIAL CRITIC AWARD (Egypt)

Heritages (Mirath) (2014)

Nominations:

 DIFF 2013, FIPA and Thessaloniki Festivals

Awards:

 The Silver HAMBRA award: Granada Cines del Sur Film Festival
 The Audience Award: Arab Film Festival – San Francisco
 Best Director and Best Editing in the Lebanese Movie Guide Awards 2015
 Under the Bombs (2007/8)
 23 prizes, amongst which are:
 The Golden Muhr Award and the Best Film and Best Actress Award at the Festival of Dubai (2007)
 EIUC Human Rights Film Award at the Venice Film Festival (2007)
 Critics Award and NETPAC Award Festival in Antalya (2007)
 Sundance FF 2008
 FIPRESCI International Critics Award Festival Bratislava (2008)
 Best feature film in the One World Media Award in London (2009)

Bosta (2005/6)

Awards:

 Best Scenario Award at Carthage Festival in 2002
 Murex D’Or in Lebanon
 Best First Work Award at the Arab Film Festival Rotterdam
 IMA Award for First Feature Film
 Audience Award at the Queens International Festival
 Young Audience Award at Artemare Festival of Corsica.

Sources
Fantascope Production: Fantascope
IMDb: Philippe Aractingi
AlloCine: Philippe Aractingi

Press releases
Thawra Soul (2021)
 Ici Beyrouth: https://icibeyrouth.com/culture/15717 ""Thawra Soul" de Philippe Aractingi: onze minutes et… l’éternité?"
 Télérama: https://www.telerama.fr/cinema/films/thawra-soul,n6980127.php
Héritages (2013)
L'Orient-Le Jour: « Héritages » de Philippe Aractingi, ou l’histoire en marche
Cannes 2013: Philippe Aractingi | Director | Cannes 2013
Josyane Boulos, "Mon quotidien dans un chaos organisé": Mon quotidien dans un chaos organisé, Beyrouth.
An Nahar: فيلم - ميراث فيليب عرقتنجي: وطن في سيرة
Film Review: ‘Heritages’
Under the Bombs (2008)
The Telegraph: Philippe Aractingi: 'I wanted to present war differently'
The Daily Telegraph "In a cinematic season of war, with a batch of heavyweight Hollywood films dealing with events in the Middle East, none was made under more treacherous, life-threatening conditions than Under the Bombs." David Gritten (UK / daily)
Variety (magazine) "The docu-fiction road movie "Under the Bombs" plays like a cri de coeur. Shot during the fighting, apparently without a script, these improvised scenes score with their emotional authenticity." Alissa Simon
Variety (magazine) "Aractingi's pic, partly shot during last year's hostilities, received a lengthy standing ovation following its Lido bow." Ali Jafaar
Il Messaggero "Under the bombs has the merit to tell the facts without trading on them and adding something to our perceptive horizon." Francesco Alo’ (Italy / daily)
Il Manifesto "Sous les bombes is one of the best film in Venice Days. Maybe the reference could be Germania anno zero (Germany year zero) by Roberto Rossellini. Classifying it as a fiction – or a documentary – is a limit: its substance is in the truth he tells and, at the same time, in the act of destabilizing its representation. An emotional film, without rhetoric." Cristina Piccino (Italy / daily)
Il Sole 24 Ore "A bombproof location !" Cristina Battocletti (Italy/daily)
Bosta (2006)
Guardian Unlimited, UK, FEV 2006 "It’s a fast-paced, colourful movie that captures both the beauty and the problems of this country."
The Washington Post, USA, MARCH 2006 "It was a breath of fresh air. It did not deal with the war in a blunt way, but indirectly. For once, the healing process that Lebanese society is supposed to go through is the focus."

References

External links

 

1964 births
Living people
Artists from Beirut
Lebanese emigrants to France
Lebanese film directors
Lebanese film producers
French documentary filmmakers
Documentary war filmmakers